The discography of South Korean girl group S.E.S. consists of eight studio albums, six compilation albums, three video albums, and one remix album. The group debuted in 1997 under SM Entertainment and disbanded in 2002. The group made a reunion in 2016 with their sixth Korean studio album.

Albums

Studio albums

Compilation albums

Video albums

Remix albums

Singles

Notes

References

External links
 
 

Discographies of South Korean artists
K-pop music group discographies